Paul Joseph TenHaken is an American businessman and website developer who has served as the mayor of Sioux Falls, South Dakota since May 15, 2018.

Early life and education 
TenHaken was born in Sioux Center, Iowa, to parents Lyle and Beth TenHaken. He was raised in Worthington, Minnesota. TenHaken attended Dordt College and received his degree in graphic design in 2000. Upon graduation, TenHaken moved to Sioux Falls, South Dakota, and worked as the mascot of the Sioux Falls Skyforce. He attended the University of Sioux Falls and received an MBA in 2004.

Business career
TenHaken founded Click Rain, a marketing technology agency in Sioux Falls, in 2008. TenHaken was named one of Entrepreneur magazine's Top 10 Emerging Entrepreneurs as well as South Dakota Young Entrepreneur of the Year. TenHaken is also the co-founder of the Dispatch Project, a non-profit that organizes overseas mission opportunities for business leaders. His efforts have received accolades from Entrepreneur Magazine, When Work Works, Inc. Magazine, and Sioux Falls Business Journal.

Mayor of Sioux Falls
TenHaken placed first in the April 10, 2018 election, and won the May 1 run-off election with 62.7% of the vote.

On April 9, 2020, over 80 employees at a Smithfield Foods pork processing plant in Sioux Falls were confirmed to have tested positive for COVID-19. The plant announced it would suspend operations beginning April 11. On April 14, 2020, TenHaken stated he would be proposing a stay at home order to the city council. After three days and tremendous backlash, he decided not to pursue the stay at home order.  Mayor TenHaken is credited as saying it is difficult to lead locally in a non-partisan way.  He has also said a mask mandate could 'destroy a city' due to how politicized the issue had become.

In April 2022, Mayor TenHaken was re-elected to serve a second term as mayor by securing 73% of the vote, a record for any mayoral race in the City of Sioux Falls since transitioning to its current form of government.

Electoral history

References

1977 births
21st-century American politicians
American marketing businesspeople
Dordt University alumni
Living people
Mayors of Sioux Falls, South Dakota
South Dakota Republicans
University of Sioux Falls alumni
21st-century American businesspeople
American company founders
People from Sioux Center, Iowa
People from Worthington, Minnesota
Businesspeople from South Dakota